Howard Edward Davis Jr. (February 14, 1956 – December 30, 2015) was an American professional boxer. Growing up on Long Island as the eldest of 10 children, Davis first learned boxing from his father. After being inspired by a movie about Muhammad Ali, Davis embarked on his amateur career. He won the 1976 Olympic gold medal one week after his mother died. He was also awarded the Val Barker Trophy at the Olympics, beating out such boxers as Sugar Ray Leonard, Michael Spinks and Leon Spinks.

He turned professional after the Olympics and went on to compile a professional record of 36–6–1 with 14 knockouts. He retired in 1996. After retirement he became a trainer. Eventually he worked as boxing director at American Top Team in Coconut Creek, Florida, where he trained both amateur and professional boxers and MMA fighters. He was also a motivational speaker and a musician.

Amateur career
As an amateur, Davis was trained by his father, a former boxer. He had an outstanding amateur career. In 1976, Davis won the Olympic gold medal in the lightweight division in Montreal, Quebec, Canada.

Davis was also named the Outstanding Boxer of the 1976 Olympics and given the Val Barker Trophy. His Olympic teammates included Sugar Ray Leonard, Michael Spinks and Leon Spinks.

His Olympic victory came just one week after his mother died of a heart attack.

Davis had an amateur record of 125–5.

Amateur accomplishments include:
1973 National AAU Champion (125 lb)
Defeated Leroy Veasley of Detroit in the final
1974 World Championships (125 lbs) in Havana, Cuba
Defeated Roberto Andino (Puerto Rico) on points
Defeated Rumen Peshev (Bulgaria) on points
Defeated Eddie Ndukwu (Nigeria) on points
Defeated Mariano Álvarez (Cuba) on points
Defeated Boris Kuznetsov (Soviet Union) on points
1976 National AAU Champion (132 lbs)
Defeated Thomas Hearns on points.
1976 Olympic Trials
Defeated Aaron Pryor to qualify at 132 pounds
1976 Summer Olympics – Gold Medal (132 lbs) and Val Barker Award winner for Most Outstanding Boxer of the Games
Round of 32: Defeated Yukio Segawa (Japan) won on points
Round of 16: Defeated Leonidas Asprilla (Colombia) won by KO 2
Quarterfinal:; Defeated Tsvetan Tsvetkov (Bulgaria) won by TKO 3
Semifinal: Defeated Ace Rusevski (Yugoslavia) won on points
Final: Defeated Simion Cuţov (Romania) won on points

Professional career
Davis turned professional in 1977. After winning his first thirteen fights, he challenged Jim Watt for the WBC lightweight title in 1980. Watt won by a fifteen-round unanimous decision. In 1984, with a record of 26–1, Davis fought Edwin Rosario for the WBC lightweight title. Rosario retained his title with a twelve-round split decision. His final attempt to win a world title came in 1988. Davis was stunningly knocked out in the first round by IBF junior welterweight champion Buddy McGirt. He retired after the fight. In 1994, Davis launched a comeback as a middleweight. He retired for good after losing by second-round knockout to Dana Rosenblatt on April 13, 1996.

He finished with a professional record of 36–6–1 with 14 KO's.

Honors
In August 1976, Davis' hometown of Glen Cove, New York honored Davis with a parade for his Olympic achievement, which was attended by Lt. Governor Mary Anne Krupsak.

In July 2009, Glen Cove honored Davis by naming a street after him. The Mayor also proclaimed July 10 as Howard Davis Day in honor of both father and son.

Personal life

In 1981, Davis had his Olympic Gold Medal stolen from his home, only to be found years later by a landscaper on the side of the road. After discovering the true value of the medal, the landscaper returned the medal to Davis.

Davis served as a boxing trainer to MMA fighters, including Chuck Liddell and fighters from American Top Team. He also worked as a sports commentator, a public speaker, and a promoter for Fight Time Promotions. Davis was a boxing coach/trainer for Chuck Liddell on The Ultimate Fighter 11. Davis' wife Karla Guadamuz-Davis served as his Publicist and Business Manager.

Davis followed a strict vegetarian diet.

Davis' son Dyah is also a former professional boxer, who transitioned to a coaching career and is a boxing coach at the American Top Team.

Death

In the summer of 2015 Davis learned that he had incurable, late-stage lung cancer. He died on December 30, 2015, from the disease at the age of 59.

Professional boxing record

References

External links

1956 births
2015 deaths
Boxers from New York (state)
Boxers at the 1976 Summer Olympics
Deaths from lung cancer in Florida
Olympic boxers of the United States
Lightweight boxers
Olympic gold medalists for the United States in boxing
Winners of the United States Championship for amateur boxers
Sportspeople from Glen Cove, New York
American male boxers
African-American boxers
AIBA World Boxing Championships medalists
Medalists at the 1976 Summer Olympics
20th-century African-American sportspeople
21st-century African-American people